Gregorio Luperón is a Santo Domingo Metro station on Line 1. It was open on 22 January 2009 as part of the inaugural section of Line 1 between Mamá Tingó and Centro de los Héroes. The station is between Gregorio Urbano Gilbert and José Francisco Peña Gómez.

This is an elevated station built above Avenida Hermanas Mirabal. It is named in honor of the former president, Gregorio Luperón.

References

Santo Domingo Metro stations
2009 establishments in the Dominican Republic
Railway stations opened in 2009